The Apostolic Church is a Christian denomination and Pentecostal movement that emerged from the Welsh Revival of 1904–1905. Although the movement began in the United Kingdom, the largest national Apostolic Church is now the Apostolic Church Nigeria. The term "Apostolic" refers to the role of apostles in the denomination's church government, as well as a desire to emulate 1st century Christianity in its faith, practices, and government.

History

Beginning 

The earliest historians of the Apostolic Church date its beginnings to 1911, when three groups of people in three locations in the village of Pen-y-groes received the Pentecostal baptism in the Holy Spirit.

The Apostolic Church had adopted a system of presbyteries to govern the church collegially. While ministers were ordained as apostles, prophets, evangelists, pastors, elders or teachers all were involved in prayer and deliberation together in presbyteries at local, sectional and national levels. The names of these governing bodies eventually became distinct: the presbytery of the local church retained the name "presbytery", the regional body became known as the classis, and later the Area Pastors' Meeting and the national governing body adopted the name of General Council. Church government was not reserved to the apostles alone, as they were regarded as first among equals among the other ministers, requiring a collegial government.

Split 
For a period the Welsh churches were associated with William Oliver Hutchinson and the Apostolic Faith Church in Bournemouth, England. However, on 8 January 1916 Daniel Powell Williams and most of the Welsh assemblies separated from Hutchinson and the Apostolic Faith Church over doctrinal matters, and established the Apostolic Church in Wales (ACW). After 1916 the two groups had no further contact and developed along different doctrinal paths.

Post-split continuation 
In 1917 a second group was formed, centred on Birmingham, affiliated to the Apostolic Church in Wales. The following year the Burning Bush Pentecostal Congregation in Glasgow came into cooperation with the Apostolic Church. In the same year a group using the name "Apostolic Church" in Hereford also came into cooperation with the ACW.

In 2016 the denomination celebrated its 100th anniversary. It had 15 million members in approximately 100 countries.

Theology
Ecclesiology has taken a prominent place in the theology of the movement. The Church is defined as the Body of Christ and the headship of Christ is given prominence. Christ is seen to express his headship through the ministries of apostles, prophets, evangelists, pastors, elders and teachers.

The theological beliefs of the Apostolic Church are summarized in its confession of faith, known as the Tenets, which read as follows:

 The unity of the Godhead and the Trinity of the Persons therein.
 The utter depravity of human nature, the necessity for repentance and regeneration and the eternal doom of the finally impenitent.
 The virgin birth, sinless life, atoning death, triumphant resurrection, ascension, abiding intercession of our Lord Jesus Christ; His second coming and Millennial Reign upon earth.
 Justification and Sanctification of the believer through the finished work of Christ.
 The baptism of the Holy Ghost for believers, with signs following.
 The nine gifts of the Holy Ghost for the edification, exhortation and comfort of the Church, which is the body of Christ.
 The sacraments of baptism by immersion, and the Lord's Supper. 
 The Divine inspiration and authority of the Holy Scriptures.
 Church government by apostles, prophets, evangelists, pastors, teachers, elders and deacons.
 The possibility of falling from grace.
 The obligatory nature of tithes and offerings.

The Constitution of the Apostolic Church in the United Kingdom states that "These Tenets shall forever be the doctrinal standard of the Apostolic Church and shall not be subject to change in any way whatsoever."

Colleges
The Apostolic Church established its first theological college, the Apostolic Church International Bible School, in the village of Pen-y-groes in 1933. Colleges and seminaries have also been established in eleven other countries.

Hymnal
In the past the standard hymnal of the Apostolic Church was the Redemption Hymnal, which was produced by a joint committee from the Apostolic Church, the Elim Pentecostal Church, and the Assemblies of God in Great Britain and Ireland.

See also
 List of the largest Protestant bodies

References

External links 
Apostolic Church in the United Kingdom (official website)

1916 establishments in Wales
Ammanford
Pentecostal denominations established in the 20th century
Pentecostal denominations in the United Kingdom
Christian organizations established in 1916
Pentecostal denominations